Sufra is a type of surface from which food is eaten, and/or a ritual meal, in Islamicate cultures.

Sufra may also refer to:
 Sufra (charity), a charity based in London, England
 Al-Muhallab ibn Abi Sufra (c. 632–702, Khorasan), an Azdi Arab warrior and general
 Musawwarat es-Sufra, a large Meroitic temple complex in modern Sudan